Neyyar Safari Park  is a safari park near Neyyar Dam in Thiruvananthapuram, India, extending over an area of 40,468.564 square metres.

References

Parks in India
Safari parks